"Stronger" (stylized in caps) is a song by Japanese-American singer-songwriter Ai featuring Japanese singer Miliyah Kato. The song was released on October 27, 2010, by Island Records and Universal Sigma, serving as the fourth and final single for Ai's eighth studio album, The Last Ai.

Composition and inspiration
As a part of Ai's 10th anniversary, she had been collaborating with many artists, such as "Fake" featuring Namie Amuro, "Still..." feat. AK-69 and "Wavin' Flag (Coca Cola Celebration Mix) (Sekai ni Hitotsu no Hata)" with K'naan. When the collaboration single offer was presented to Miliyah Kato, who is good friends with Ai, her reaction was "Finally! I feel so honoured. It's like a dream I've been imagining has become real." The song was written by Ai and Kato together, with both deciding such things as the lyrics, music, and which parts to sing.

The song is a contemporary R&B dance pop song. The lyrics are a message song, instructing the listener to survive through "any kind of future," and talks about the limits of a person. In news articles, the song is described as being about "The strength to keep going forward, even when hurt."

Promotion
The song was performed twice at promotional events. At the Levi's Jeans Shape What's to Come event at Ebisu, Shibuya on October 26, Ai performed the song with Kato appearing as an unannounced guest for the event. Ai performed the song solo at a secret live event for fashion magazine Glamorous, 2010 Glamorous Night Evolution on November 2.

The song was performed at Music Station on October 29, alongside Kato. Ai appeared on an episode of King's Brunch on October 30. Two MTV Japan shows aired to promote the single: a Making the Video episode for the song's music video, aired on October 31, and a show called MTV A Class AI on November 20.

To promote the single, Ai featured in magazines such as Blenda, Glamorous, Hanachu, Nikkei Entertainment, Ori Star, Ranzuki, S-Cawaii and Woofin'.

Music video

The music video was directed by Tatsuaki, and produced by Yahman. It is Ai's first video to feature CGI graphics. The video features Ai and Kato in a white room, as black rings form and tear apart around them. The rings are meant to represent beats of people's heartbeats.

The music video debuted on MTV Japan on October 27, 2010.

Track listing

Charts

Reported sales

Release history

References

External links 
Ai Music "Stronger" profile 

2010 singles
2010 songs
Ai (singer) songs
Miliyah Kato songs
Japanese-language songs
Female vocal duets
Island Records singles
Songs written by Ai (singer)
Universal Sigma singles